The 2013 U.S. Figure Skating Championships was the national figure skating championships of the United States for the 2012–13 season.

The event was held at the CenturyLink Center Omaha in Omaha, Nebraska on January 19–27, 2013. Medals were awarded in the disciplines of men's singles, ladies' singles, pair skating, and ice dancing at the senior, junior and novice levels. For the first time, the event was expanded to include juvenile and intermediate level competitions, previously held at a separate event. The results are part of the U.S. selection criteria for the 2013 World Junior Championships, 2013 Four Continents Championships and 2013 World Championships.

Overview

The 2013 event was the second time that Omaha hosted the U.S. Championships. Competitors qualified at the Eastern, Midwestern, or Pacific Coast Sectional Championships or earned a bye.

Defending champion Jeremy Abbott won the men's short program, with Ross Miner in second and Joshua Farris in third. Max Aaron placed first in the free skate, Miner was second, and Abbott third. Aaron won gold, his first senior national medal, Miner took silver, Abbott the bronze, and Farris the pewter medal.

Defending champion Ashley Wagner was first in the ladies' short program, followed by Agnes Zawadzki and Mirai Nagasu. Gracie Gold won the long program and rose from 9th to claim the silver medal, while Wagner was second in the segment but first overall and won her second national title. Bronze medalist Zawadzki's combined score kept her on the podium and Courtney Hicks took the pewter medal.

None of the top three partnerships from 2012 competed in the pairs event, Denney / Coughlin being absent due to Coughlin's surgery and the other two pairs having split. Longtime pair Marissa Castelli / Simon Shnapir won the short program ahead of relatively new teams Felicia Zhang / Nathan Bartholomay and Alexa Scimeca / Christopher Knierim. Castelli / Shnapir were third in the free skate but remained first in the overall standings and took their first national title, while silver went to Scimeca / Knierim and bronze to Zhang / Bartholomay.

Defending champions Meryl Davis / Charlie White were first in the short dance ahead of Madison Chock / Evan Bates and Maia Shibutani / Alex Shibutani. The standings were the same in the free dance. Davis / White won their fifth national title, Chock / Bates took silver, their first time on the podium as a team, the Shibutanis settled for bronze, and Madison Hubbell / Zachary Donohue took the pewter medal.

Vincent Zhou, Shotaro Omori, Nathan Chen, and Jimmy Ma were the medalists in the junior men's event. Polina Edmunds, Mariah Bell, Barbie Long, and Karen Chen were the junior ladies' medalists. Britney Simpson / Matthew Blackmer, Jessica Calalang / Zack Sidhu, Madeline Aaron / Max Settlage, and Chelsea Liu / Devin Perini were the junior pairs' medalists. Alexandra Aldridge / Daniel Eaton, Kaitlin Hawayek / Jean-Luc Baker, Lorraine McNamara / Quinn Carpenter, and Holly Moore / Daniel Klaber were the medalists in the junior ice dancing event.

Tomoki Hiwatashi, Oleksiy Melnyk, Nicholas Vrdoljak, and Daniel Samohin were the novice men's medalists. Tyler Pierce, Amy Lin, Bradie Tennell, and Morgan Flood were the novice ladies' medalists. Christina Zaitsev / Ernie Stevens won the novice pairs' title. Chloe Lewis / Logan Bye won the novice ice dancing title.

Attendance was 90,760.

Senior results

Senior men

Senior ladies

Senior pairs

Senior ice dancing

Junior results

Junior men

Junior ladies

Junior pairs

Junior ice dancing

Novice results

Novice men

Novice ladies

Novice pairs

Novice ice dancing

Intermediate results

Intermediate men

Intermediate ladies

Intermediate pairs

Intermediate ice dancing

Juvenile results

Juvenile boys

Juvenile girls

Juvenile pairs

Juvenile ice dancing

International assignments
U.S. Figure Skating announced international assignments on January 27, 2013.

Four Continents Championships

World Junior Championships

World Championships

References

External links

 2013 United States Figure Skating Championships results at U.S. Figure Skating

2013
Sports competitions in Omaha, Nebraska
2013 in figure skating
2013 in American sports
January 2013 sports events in the United States